Puri Lok Sabha Constituency is one of the 21 Lok Sabha (Parliamentary) Constituencies in Odisha state in Eastern India.

Assembly segments
Assembly Constituencies which constitute this Parliamentary Constituency, after delimitation of Parliamentary Constituencies and Legislative Assembly Constituencies of 2008 are:

Assembly Constituencies which constituted this Parliamentary Constituency, before delimitation of Parliamentary Constituencies and Legislative Assembly Constituencies of 2008 are:

Members of Parliament

Election Result

General election 2019

In 2019 general elections Pinaki Misra of Biju Janata Dal won defeating Bharatiya Janata Party's spokesperson Sambit Patra.

General election 2014
In 2014 election, Biju Janata Dal candidate Pinaki Mishra defeated Indian National Congress candidate Sucharita Mohanty by a margin of 2,63,361 votes and Bharatiya Janata Party candidate Ashok Sahu.

General Election 2009

References

Lok Sabha constituencies in Odisha
Puri district
Khordha district
Nayagarh district